Beyond the Clouds may refer to:
 
Beyond the Clouds (1995 film), a 1995 French film directed by Michelangelo Antonioni and Wim Wenders
Beyond the Clouds (2017 film), a Hindi-language film
Beyond the Clouds (TV series), a 2014 South Korean television series
The Place Promised in Our Early Days or Beyond the Clouds, a 2004 90-minute Japanese anime film directed by Makoto Shinkai